John Wilson is a New Zealand rugby league footballer who represented New Zealand in the 1972 World Cup.

Playing career
Wilson played for the Te Atatu Roosters and represented Auckland. A fullback, Wilson was selected for the New Zealand national rugby league team in 1972. He played in two matches at that year's World Cup, scoring three goals.

In the second half of his career Wilson joined the Northcote Tigers and in 1975 won the Painter Rosebowl Trophy as the top point scorer in the Auckland Rugby League competition. In 1977 he won the Lipscombe Cup as Auckland's Sportsman of the Year. That same year, he was involved in Auckland's "Grand Slam" as they defeated Australia 19-15 on 1 June, Great Britain 14-10 on 14 June and France 17-0 on 21 June all at Carlaw Park.

Wilson was also part of the New Zealand Māori sides that won both the 1975 and 1977 Pacific Cups.

References

Living people
Auckland rugby league team players
New Zealand Māori rugby league players
New Zealand Māori rugby league team players
New Zealand national rugby league team players
New Zealand rugby league players
Northcote Tigers players
Rugby league fullbacks
Te Atatu Roosters players
Year of birth missing (living people)